Desmodium rhytidophyllum is a small twining herb or trailing shrub in the family Fabaceae. A plant with rusty or felty hairs on all parts, found in eastern and northern Australia. Attractive pink flowers may form at any time of the year. The specific epithet rhytidophyllum is derived from Greek, describing the wrinkled leaves.

References

External links 
 
 

rhytidophyllum
Flora of New South Wales
Flora of Queensland
Flora of the Northern Territory
Taxa named by Ferdinand von Mueller